First Lieutenant David Eastburn Buckingham (February 3, 1840 to November 23, 1915) was an American soldier who fought in the American Civil War. Buckingham received the country's highest award for bravery during combat, the Medal of Honor, for his action at Rowanty Creek in Virginia on 5 February 1865. He was honored with the award on 13 February 1895.

Biography
Buckingham was born on 3 February 1840 and enlisted in the 4th Delaware Volunteer Infantry. On 5 February 1865 he, along with S. Rodmond Smith , swam across the Rowanty Creek, which was partially frozen, in order to capture a crossing. He was awarded with the Medal of Honor on 13 February 1895 for this feat.

He died on 23 November 1915 and his remains are interred at the Arlington National Cemetery.

Medal of Honor citation

See also

List of American Civil War Medal of Honor recipients: A–F

References

1840 births
1915 deaths
People of Delaware in the American Civil War
Union Army officers
United States Army Medal of Honor recipients
American Civil War recipients of the Medal of Honor